Puteri Indonesia 2012-2013, the 17th Annual Puteri Indonesia beauty pageant, was held in Jakarta Convention Center, Jakarta, Indonesia on February 1, 2013.

Previous edition of Puteri Indonesia was held in October 2011 and the next edition was supposed to be held on 2012, but because Miss Universe 2012 was held in December 2012 the organization decided to reschedule the event to February 2013. Thirty eight contestants from all 33 provinces of Indonesia competed for the title of Puteri Indonesia, one of the most prominent beauty pageant titles in the country.

Maria Selena, Puteri Indonesia 2011 from Central Java crowned her successor Whulandary Herman from West Sumatra at the end of this event. The winner is going to represent Indonesia at the Miss Universe 2013, while the runners-up will represent the nation at the Miss International 2013, Miss Supranational 2013 and Miss Grand International 2013. The event was broadcast live on Indonesian television network, Indosiar. The winner of Miss Universe 2012 Olivia Culpo from USA, was present during the event.

Result 
The Crowns of Puteri Indonesia Title Holders
 Puteri Indonesia 2013 (Miss Universe Indonesia 2013) 
 Puteri Indonesia Lingkungan 2013 (Miss International Indonesia 2013)
 Puteri Indonesia Pariwisata 2013 (Miss Supranational Indonesia 2013)
 Puteri Indonesia Perdamaian (Miss Grand Indonesia 2013)

Contestants

References

External links 

 Official Puteri Indonesia Official Website
 Official Miss Universe Official Website
 Miss International Official Website
 Official Miss Supranational Official Website

2013
Puteri Indonesia